State Road 42 is an IB-class road in southern Serbia, connecting Čukarka with Čaglavica. It is located in Southern and Eastern Serbia and Kosovo and Metohija regions. The section between Depče and Čaglavica is controlled by Kosovo government and UNMIK.
Before the new road categorization regulation given in 2013, the route wore the following names: P 237 and M 25.2 (before 2012) / 35 (after 2012).

The existing route is a main road with two traffic lanes. By the valid Space Plan of Republic of Serbia the road is not planned for upgrading to motorway, and is expected to be conditioned in its current state.

Sections

See also 
 Roads in Serbia
 Roads in Kosovo

Notes

References

External links 
 Official website - Roads of Serbia (Putevi Srbije)
 Official website - Corridors of Serbia (Koridori Srbije) (Serbian)

State roads in Serbia